Muhammad Farid bin Azmi (born 23 March 1994) is a Malaysian professional footballer who plays as a left-back for Melaka United.

References

External links
 

1994 births
People from Kuala Lumpur
Living people
Malaysian people of Malay descent
Malaysian Muslims
Malaysian footballers
UiTM FC players
Sarawak United FC players
Melaka United F.C. players
Malaysia Super League players
Association football defenders